Jacques Weisser (born Salomon Jacques Weisser; February 7, 1942) is a Belgian-born English trustee of Yad Vashem in the United Kingdom and former executive director of the Association of Jewish Ex-Servicemen and Women.

Early life
Salomon Jacques Weisser was born in Antwerp, Belgium to Jakob Weisser and Martha Mandelbaum, both of Polish-Jewish descent. In the summer of 1942, following the Western Campaign, his father was deported to labor camps in Northern France where he was forced to work as slave labor for Organisation Todt, dedicated to the construction of the Atlantic Wall. Weisser would remain with his mother in Antwerp until September 11, 1942, where she was arrested in public and later deported to and murdered in Auschwitz-Birkenau as part of the Holocaust. With the arrest of his mother, and lacking both his parents, he was rescued by an unknown individual and brought to the children's home of Meisjeshuis. The exact circumstances surrounding both the arrest of his mother and his retrieval remain unclear, but his appropriation of orphan status would ensure protection against deportation. On September 21, 1942, twenty five Jewish children who were with Weisser in Meisjeshuis were arrested after surpassing toddlerhood through reaching the age of 5 and all deported to Auschwitz-Birkenau, where they died. Weisser and the other younger surviving children were then moved from Meisjeshuis to the Sint-Erasmus hospital in Borgerhout. He remained here in hiding up until June 1944 when he was discovered and arrested by the Germans; Weisser would survive the Holocaust and was not deported, in large part due to the enforcement within Belgium of statutes preventing the deportation of orphaned infants. His father would survive several concentration camps (notably Auschwitz-Birkenau as well as Buchenwald in its final days) and a death march during the German retreat from Poland, reuniting with Weisser in 1945.

Notes

Bibliography

References 

1942 births
Holocaust survivors
Living people